The Senegalese Basketball Cup is an annual cup competition for men's basketball teams in Senegal. The cup is one of the main tournaments for men's teams, along with the Saint Michel Cup and the Super Cup.

The record holders for most Cup titles are AS Douanes, who have won seven cups. DUC are the last team to win the competition, having won the 2022 Cup title.

Finals

Performance by club

References

See also
Nationale 1 (Senegal)
Saint Michel Cup
Senegalese Super Cup (basketball)

Basketball competitions in Senegal
Basketball cup competitions in Africa